Hoseynabad (also Romanized as Ḩoseynābād and Husainābād; also known as Hosein Abad Dodangeh) is a village in Dodangeh-ye Sofla Rural District, Ziaabad District, Takestan County, Qazvin Province, Iran. At the 2006 census, its population was 411, in 97 families.

References 

Populated places in Takestan County